State Road 121 (NM 121) is a  state highway in the US state of New Mexico. NM 121's southern terminus is at NM 518 south of Holman, and the northern terminus is at the end of state maintenance near Chacon.

Major intersections

See also

References

121
Transportation in Rio Arriba County, New Mexico